Many of the historical techniques currently listed here come from the teachings of Fiore dei Liberi or the Bolognese / Dardi School.

A 

 a voi
 phrase, lit. "to you"
 Spoken by the director at outset to turn control over to the fencers. Full commencing phrase is "In guardia. Pronti/-e? A voi"

B 

 balestra
 noun f. (plural balestre), lit. "crossbow"
 A footwork preparation, consisting of a jump or hop forwards with an immediate lunge. This is the definition found in the French national fencing glossary, though it is common in the English world for balestra to refer to only a jump. Jumps are faster than a normal step, which helps change the rhythm and timing of moves

C 

 colpo fendente
 noun m. (plural colpi fendenti), lit. "cleaving blow" [fendente cognate with English fend, both deriving from Latin findō ("cleave, split")]
 (Fiore) A descending blow which parts the body from the teeth to the knee. Follows the same path as the cut which Dardi authors called mandritto squalembrato
 (Dardi school) A descending vertical cut
 Abbr. fendente

 colpo mezano
 noun m. (plural colpi mezani), lit. "middle blow"
 A blow which goes through the middle of fendenti e sottani, delivered with the true edge on the mandritto side and the false edge on the riverso side. Its path is "between the knee and the head"
 Abbr. mezano

 colpo sottano
 noun m. (plural colpi sottani), (archaic) "lower blow"
 A rising blow which parts the body from the knees to the middle of the forehead
 Abbr. sottano

D 

 dritto
adjective m. (plural dritti), lit. "right (side)"
 Describes any cut that starts on the fencer's right side. Applies to cuts: falso dritto, fendente dritto, molinetto dritto, e tramazzone dritto. Antonyms: riverso e manco

F 

 falso 
 noun m. (plural falsi), lit. "right (side)"
 A rising cut made with the false edge of the blade on the same line as either colpo squalembrato
 adjective m.
 Describes any cut made with the false edge of the blade

 fendente
 noun m. (plural fendenti)
 Abbr. of colpo fendente

I 

 imbroccata 
 noun f. (plural imbroccate)
 An overhand descending thrust

 in guardia
 phrase, lit. "en garde"
 Spoken by the director to alert fencers to take their stances. Full commencing phrase is "In guardia. Pronti/-e? A voi"

 in quartata
 phrase
 An evasive action that is recognized under category of the defensive actions (See also #passata-sotto), made with a quarter turn to the inside that conceals the front but exposes the back. This attempts to move some of the target out of harm’s way during an attack or a counter-attack. This evasive action is often executed and used in conjunction with opposition parry

M 

 manco 
 adjective m. (plural manchi), lit. "right (side)". antonyms: riverso, dritto
 Describes any cut that starts on the fencer's left side. Applies to cuts: falso manco, fendente manco, molinetto manco, e tramazzone manco

 mandritto 
 noun m. (plural mandritti). antonyms: riverso, colpo manco
 Any cut that starts on the fencer's right side
 A descending right-to-left diagonal cut on the line from ear to knee, mirroring riverso squalembrato. Also called mandritto squalembrato>

 mezano
 noun m. (plural mezani)
 Abbr. of colpo mezano

 molinetto 
 noun m. (plural molinetti)
 A certain rotational cut

 montando
 adjective m. (plural montandi), gerund of montare ("to climb")
 Describes an ascending cut

 montante
 noun m. (plural montanti), past participle of montare ("to climb")
 An ascending vertical cut

P 

 passata-sotto
 noun f.
 An evasive action which is initiated by dropping a hand to the floor and lowering the body under the opponent's oncoming blade. Often accompanied by a straightening of the sword arm to attempt a hit on the opposing combatant

 patinando
 noun & verb (plural patinandi), gerund of patinare ("to patine")
 A quickly executed advance-lunge

 posta breve
 noun f. (plural poste brevi)
 The short guard

 posta breve la serpentina
 noun f. (plural poste brevi la serpentina)
 The short serpant guard

 posta dente di zenghiaro
 noun f. (plural poste dente di zenghiaro)
 The boar's tooth guard
 Abbr. dente di zenghiaro

 posta dente di zenghiaro mezana
 noun f. (plural poste dente di zenghiaro mezane)
 The middle boar's tooth guard
 Abbr. dente di zenghiaro mezana

 posta di bicorno
 noun f.
 The two-horn guard

 posta di coda longa
 noun f.
 The long tail guard. Also posta di choda longa

 posta di coda longa la sinestra
 noun f.
 The left-side long tail guard

 posta di crose bastarda
 noun f.
 The bastard cross guard, a variant of la posta di vera crose. Taking a pass at the opponent from posta breve la serpentina leaves the fencer in posta di crose bastarda, with the pommel towards the opponent

 posta di corona
 noun f.
 The crown guard. Also called posta frontale ("frontal guard")

 posta di donna
 noun f.
 The lady guard

 posta di donna la sinestra
 noun f.
 The left-side lady guard

 posta di donna la soprano
 noun f.
 The high lady guard

 posta di fenestra
 noun f.
 The window guard

 posta di fenestra la sinestra
 noun f.
 The left-side window guard

 posta di vera crose
 noun f.
 The true cross guard

 posta frontale
 noun f.
 The frontal guard. Also called posta di corona ("crown guard")

 posta longa
 noun f.
 The long guard

 posta mezza porta di ferro
 noun f.
 The middle iron gate guard. Also called posta di ferro mezano

 posta porta di ferro
 noun f.
 The iron gate guard

 posta porta di ferro la sinestra
 noun f.
 The left-side iron gate guard

 posta porta di ferro tutta
 noun f.
 The full iron gate guard

 posta saggitaria
 noun f.
 The archer's guard

 pronti
 adjective m. (singular pronto)
 Spoken by the director at outset to ask if the fencers are ready to fight. When both fencers are female, the proper word is "pronte." Full commencing phrase is "In guardia. Pronti/-e? A voi"
 plural of pronto ("ready")

 punta
 noun f. (plural punte)
 A thrust, whose path is in the middle of the body from the groin to the forehead. Can be made in five ways: Two high—One left one right—(needs work)
 lit. "point"

R 

 ricasso
 A dull portion of the blade in front of the quillons. In complex rapier and smallsword hilts, the ricasso is behind the guard, or the forward portion of the hilt

 ridoppio
 noun m. (plural ridoppi)
 A rising cut with either edge that immediately follows a descending cut
 lit. "redouble"

 riverso 
 noun m. (plural riversi)
 Any cut that starts opposite the fencer's dominant side. Antonyms: mandritto, e manco
 A certain descending diagonal cut on the line from ear to knee. Also called riverso squalembrato. Mirror of mandritto squalembrato

S 

 stoccata
 noun f. (plural stoccate)
 A rising thrust

 sonno serpentino lo soprano
 noun m. (plural sonni serpentini lo soprano)
 Sleeping high serpent (guard)

 squalembrato 
 adjective m. (plural squalembrati)
 Describes any descending diagonal cut on the line from ear to knee. Applies to i colpi mandritto e riverso. Reverse of il falso

T 
 tondo
 adjective m. (plural tondi)
 Describes a cut which travels horizontally. Applies to i colpi mandritto e riverso
 lit. "circular"

 tramazzone 
 noun m. (plural colpi tramazzoni )
 A certain rotational cut

 traversato
 adjective m. (plural traversati)
 Describes a blow made across the line of engagement
 past participle of traversare ("to cross")

References 

Glossaries of sports
Fencing
Italy sport-related lists
Wikipedia glossaries using description lists